The Personals (also known as The Personals: Improvisations on Romance in the Golden Years) is a 1998 American short documentary film directed by  about a Jewish senior citizens' theatre group in New York City. In 1999, it won an Oscar at the 71st Academy Awards for Documentary Short Subject.

Cast
 Gloria Bobrofsky as Performer
 Abram Calderon as Performer
 Deborah Ehrlich as Performer
 Seth Glassman as Performer
 Harold Gordon as Performer
 Harold Krinsky as Performer
 Ruth Krinsky as Performer
 Moe Kronberg as Performer
 Fred Schechter as Performer
 Rose Straub as Performer
 Shirley Tavel as Performer
 Selma Wernick as Performer

References

External links
The Personals at Fanlight Productions

1998 films
1990s short documentary films
American short documentary films
American independent films
Best Documentary Short Subject Academy Award winners
Documentary films about theatre
Documentary films about old age
Documentary films about Jews and Judaism in the United States
Documentary films about New York City
1998 independent films
1990s English-language films
1990s American films